In Greek mythology, Hippalmus or Hippalmos (Ancient Greek: Ἵππαλμόν or Ἵππαλμος) may refer to the following personages:

 Hippalmus, a chieftain of the Arachotes and Dersaioi, who armed themselves against Dionysus in the Indian War. He is father of Billaeus and Pyloites.
 Hippalmus, one of the Calydonian boar hunters who along with Pelagon was attacked by the boar. Their bodies was taken up by their comrades and they survived the attack.
 Hippalmus, alternative name of Hippalcimus, son of Itonus (himself son of Boeotus). He was the father by Asterope of Peneleos, one of the Boeotian leaders.
 Hippalmus, an Achaean warrior who participated in the Trojan War. He was slain by the Amazon queen, Penthesilia.

Notes

References 

 Gaius Julius Hyginus, Fabulae from The Myths of Hyginus translated and edited by Mary Grant. University of Kansas Publications in Humanistic Studies. Online version at the Topos Text Project.
Lucius Mestrius Plutarchus, Moralia with an English Translation by Frank Cole Babbitt. Cambridge, MA. Harvard University Press. London. William Heinemann Ltd. 1936. Online version at the Perseus Digital Library. Greek text available from the same website.
Nonnus of Panopolis, Dionysiaca translated by William Henry Denham Rouse (1863-1950), from the Loeb Classical Library, Cambridge, MA, Harvard University Press, 1940.  Online version at the Topos Text Project.
Nonnus of Panopolis, Dionysiaca. 3 Vols. W.H.D. Rouse. Cambridge, MA., Harvard University Press; London, William Heinemann, Ltd. 1940-1942. Greek text available at the Perseus Digital Library.
Publius Ovidius Naso, Metamorphoses translated by Brookes More (1859-1942). Boston, Cornhill Publishing Co. 1922. Online version at the Perseus Digital Library.
Quintus Smyrnaeus, The Fall of Troy translated by Way. A. S. Loeb Classical Library Volume 19. London: William Heinemann, 1913. Online version at theoi.com
Quintus Smyrnaeus, The Fall of Troy. Arthur S. Way. London: William Heinemann; New York: G.P. Putnam's Sons. 1913. Greek text available at the Perseus Digital Library.
Tzetzes, John, Allegories of the Iliad translated by Goldwyn, Adam J. and Kokkini, Dimitra. Dumbarton Oaks Medieval Library, Harvard University Press, 2015. 

Achaeans (Homer)
Boeotian characters in Greek mythology